3D printing filament is the thermoplastic feedstock for fused deposition modeling 3D printers. There are many types of filament available with different properties. 

Filament comes in a range of diameters, most commonly 1.75 mm and 2.85 mm, with the latter often being confused with the less common 3 mm. 

Filament consists of one continuous slender plastic thread spooled into a reel.

Production

Commercially produced filament

3D printing filament is created using a process of heating, extruding and cooling plastic to transform nurdles into the finished product. However, unlike a 3D printer, the filament is pulled rather than pushed through the nozzle to create the filament, the diameter of the filament is defined by the process that takes place after the plastic has been heated rather than the diameter of the extruder nozzle. A different force and speed is applied to the filament as it is pulled out of the extruder to define the width of the filament, most commonly 1.75 mm or 2.85 mm diameter.

The plastic nurdles are always white or clear. Pigments or other additives are added to the material before it is melted to create coloured filament or filament with special properties, e.g. increased strength or magnetic properties. Before the filament is extruded the nurdles are heated to 80 °C to dry it and reduce water content. The nurdles must be dried as many thermoplastics are hygroscopic and extrusion of damp plastic causes dimensional flaws (this is also the case when the finished filament is being printed). From there the nurdles are fed into a single screw extruder where it is heated and extruded into a filament. The diameter is often measured by a laser beam(not melting) as part of a quality control mechanism to ensure correct diameter of the filament. The filament is then fed through a warm water tank which cools the filament which gives the filament its round shape. The filament is then fed through a cold water tank to cool it to room temperature. It is then wound onto a spool to create the finished product.

DIY filament production
DIY filament production machines use the same method as FDM 3D printers of pushing the filament through the extruder to create the correct diameter filament. There are several DIY filament machines available as both open source plans and commercially available machines.

A food dehydrator can be used to remove water from hygroscopic materials at above 70 °C.

Use 

The process of transforming 3D printing filament into a 3D model 
 The filament is fed into the FDM 3D printer. 
  The thermoplastic is heated past their glass transition temperature inside the hotend.
 The filament is extruded and deposited by an extrusion head onto a build platform where it cools. 
 The process is continuous, building up layers to create the model.

Materials

References 

Plastics
3D printing